Julian Slater is an English sound designer, known for his work in films Scott Pilgrim vs. the World , Mad Max: Fury Road, Hilary and Jackie and Baby Driver for which he was nominated for Academy Award for Best Sound Editing and Sound Mixing (co-nominated with Tim Cavagin and Mary H. Ellis)

References

External links

British sound artists
Living people
Year of birth missing (living people)